In mathematics, a Rosati involution, named after Carlo Rosati,  is an involution of the rational endomorphism ring of an abelian variety induced by a polarization.

Then each divisor  on  defines a map  via . The map  is a polarization if  is ample.

The polarization  also induces an inclusion  via . The operation  then gives  the structure of a formally real Jordan algebra.

References

Algebraic geometry